Scott County is a county located in the central part of the U.S. state of Kentucky. As of the 2020 census, the population was 57,155. Scott County is part of the Lexington–Fayette, Kentucky Metropolitan Statistical Area.

History
Native Americans inhabited the Scott County area from perhaps 15,000 years ago. Evidence has been identified that belongs the Adena culture (800 B.C. - 800 A.D.), including several significant Adena mounds.

The area was explored by American explorers as early as 1774. One of the earliest settlers was John McClelland from Pennsylvania, who built McLelland's Fort overlooking the Georgetown spring. During the American Revolution, pro-British Native Americans attacked McLelland's Fort in 1777, causing the settlement to be abandoned. Six years later, a new and permanent settlement was founded by Robert and Jemima Johnson, who built Johnson Station (later called Great Crossing), near the north fork of Elkhorn Creek, about five miles west of today's Georgetown.

All of Kentucky was originally part of Virginia's frontier. However, in 1776 Virginia reorganized it as Kentucky County. In 1780 this county was divided into the three large counties of  Lincoln, Jefferson, and Fayette. In 1788, Fayette County was divided to create Woodford County.

On June 1, 1792, the state of Kentucky came into existence. An early act of the new state  legislature divided Woodford County into two counties. One of these became Scott County, named for General Charles Scott, a Revolutionary War hero, who would serve as Kentucky's fourth governor (1808-1812). Its area was taken from the existing Woodford County. Other counties established before the end of 1792 were Clark, Shelby, Logan, and Green counties.

In 1784, Elijah Craig (1743-1808), a Virginia preacher, induced the Virginia legislature to incorporate the town of Lebanon, near the site of McLelland's Fort. In 1790 the town's name was changed to George Town, to honor then-President George Washington. Elijah Craig is also credited with founding the county's first classical school, the first sawmill, the first gristmill, the first fulling and paper mill, the first ropewalk, and (possibly) the area's first bourbon whiskey. On December 27, 1787, edition of the Kentucky Gazette, he solicited scholars to study at an academy that would open in January 1788 "in Lebanon town," and would offer courses in Latin, Greek, and "such branches of the sciences as are usually taught in public seminaries." Ten years later the school was absorbed by the Rittenhouse Academy, which was given by the state some 5,900 acres in Christian and Cumberland counties so that they might sell the land to benefit their endowment fund. The academy, in turn, was absorbed by Georgetown College in 1829.

The community went into a decline after the death of Elijah Craig in 1808. When Elder Barton Warren Stone (1772-1844), a founder of the Christian Churches movement during the Great Revival, moved to Georgetown in 1816 to become principal of Rittenhouse Academy, he found the community "notorious for its wickedness and irreligion."

In 1825, the Choctaw Nation established the Choctaw Academy at Blue Spring in Scott County. They operated the school for Choctaw boys until 1842, when it was closed. The staff and records moved to the Choctaw Nation, Indian Territory, where the Choctaw Nation had been relocated in the 1830s. In 1844 the Spencer Academy opened as the school for Choctaw boys, while a school was also opened for girls. Later in the century, they allowed Baptist missionaries to found the Armstrong Academy there.

During the American Civil War, Scott County furnished the Union Army with 118 soldiers, while about 1,000 enlisted in the Confederate Army. On November 18, 1861, Scott County native George W. Johnson was elected the provisional Confederate governor of Kentucky.

Scott County is a moist county, meaning that is a dry county with a wet city (Georgetown) within it.

Geography

Adjacent counties
 Grant County  (north)
 Harrison County  (northeast)
 Bourbon County  (east)
 Fayette County  (southeast)
 Woodford County  (southwest)
 Franklin County  (west)
 Owen County  (northwest)

Demographics

As of the census of 2000, there were 33,061 people, 12,110 households, and 8,985 families residing in the county. The racial makeup of the county was 91.94% White, 5.35% Black or African American, 0.26% Native American, 0.50% Asian, 0.01% Pacific Islander, 0.82% from other races, and 1.13% from two or more races. 1.61% of the population were Hispanic or Latino of any race.

There were 12,110 households, out of which 38.50% had children under the age of 18 living with them, 58.80% were married couples living together, 11.50% had a female householder with no husband present, and 25.80% were non-families. 21.00% of all households were made up of individuals, and 7.00% had someone living alone who was 65 years of age or older. The average household size was 2.61 and the average family size was 3.01.

In the county, the population was spread out, with 26.30% under the age of 18, 11.80% from 18 to 24, 32.60% from 25 to 44, 20.40% from 45 to 64, and 8.90% who were 65 years of age or older. The median age was 32 years. For every 100 females, there were 95.80 males. For every 100 females age 18 and over, there were 90.70 males.

The median income for a household in the county was $47,081, and the median income for a family was $54,117. Males had a median income of $40,604 versus $25,767 for females. The per capita income for the county was $21,490. About 7.30% of families and 8.80% of the population were below the poverty line, including 11.00% of those under age 18 and 12.10% of those age 65 or over.

Communities
 Georgetown (county seat)
 Sadieville
 Stamping Ground
 Great Crossing

Notable people
 James C. C. Black - U.S. Representative from Georgia. Born in Stamping Ground.
 J. Campbell Cantrill - politician, U.S. Representative from Kentucky.
Julia Chinn - common-law wife of Vice-President Richard M. Johnson.
 Daniel Cook - First Attorney General of Illinois.
 Basil Duke - Confederate General, took part in Morgan's Raid. Brother-in-law of John Hunt Morgan.
 William H. Hatch - politician, U.S. Representative from Missouri.
 Henry P. Haun - politician, U.S. Senator from California.
 George W. Johnson - politician, 1st Confederate Governor of Kentucky, died at the Battle of Shiloh.
 John T. Johnson - politician, U.S. Representative from Kentucky, brother of Richard M. Johnson.
 Richard M. Johnson - politician, Vice-President of the United States 1837–43.
 Tom L. Johnson - U.S. Representative from Ohio 1891–95, Mayor of Cleveland 1901–1909.
 John M. Palmer - Civil War general, Governor of Illinois 1869–1873, National Democratic Party presidential candidate 1896.
 James F. Robinson - politician, 22nd Governor of Kentucky. Federal governor during the Civil War. Cardome in Georgetown was his family home.
 John M. Robinson - politician, United States Senator from Illinois.
 Robert Ward Johnson - U.S. and Confederate senator from Arkansas. Nephew of Richard M. Johnson.
 Ryan Quarles - Kentucky Commissioner of Agriculture
 Gustavus W. Smith - General in the Confederate Army during the Civil War, Confederate Secretary of War in 1862.
 Junius Ward - 19th century horseman and plantation owner, founder of Ward Hall.
 Edith Summers Kelley - Canadian author, wrote Weeds (1923), novel about "an artistic tomboy in the rural hills of Kentucky, who struggles unsuccessfully to overcome the oppressive roles assigned to her as a woman"

Politics

See also

 National Register of Historic Places listings in Scott County, Kentucky

References

External links
 Scott County Kentucky

 
Kentucky counties
Lexington–Fayette metropolitan area
1792 establishments in Kentucky
Populated places established in 1792